The American Samoa national under-17 football team is the national U-17 team of American Samoa and is controlled by Football Federation American Samoa.

History

Competition Record

OFC U-17 Championship record
The OFC U-17 Championship is a tournament held once every two years to decide the only two qualification spots for the Oceania Football Confederation (OFC) and its representatives at the FIFA U-17 World Cup.

FIFA U-17 World Cup record

Results & Fixtures

1999

2001

2003

2011

2013

2015

2016

2018

2023

Current squad
The following players have been called up for the squad for the 2023 OFC U-17 Championship from 11 to 28 January 2023.

Caps and goals as of 18 January 2023 after the game against New Caledonia.

List Of Coaches
  Rupeni Luvu (2011)
  Junior Mikaele (2013)
  Uinifareti Aliva (2015)
  Frederick Maiava (2016)
  Rupeni Luvu (2018–)

See also
 American Samoa national football team
 American Samoa national under-23 football team
 American Samoa national under-20 football team
 American Samoa women's national football team
 American Samoa women's national under-17 football team

References

External links
American Samoa Football Federation official website

Football in American Samoa
under-17
Oceanian national under-17 association football teams